On 26 December 2013, a bomb blast took place in Jalpaiguri district of West Bengal that killed five persons and injured five others. Militants of Kamtapur Liberation Organization are suspected to be behind the bombing.

References

Terrorist incidents in India in 2013
Crime in West Bengal
Jalpaiguri district

Mass murder in 2013
Improvised explosive device bombings in India
December 2013 crimes in Asia